Christopher Mark Whelpdale (born 27 January 1987) is an English professional footballer who plays as a midfielder for National League South side Eastbourne Borough.

Career
After playing local football in Brentwood, Whelpdale was recruited by Norwich City's youth academy. Whelpdale later moved to Arsenal and Ipswich Town before being released.

Whelpdale began his senior career at Maldon Town, after not being offered a scholarship by Ipswich, before moving shortly to Billericay Town.

Peterborough United 
In 2007 Whelpdale signed for League Two side Peterborough United, rejecting League One side Southend United, who had just been relegated from the Football League Championship.

Gillingham 
He joined Gillingham on loan in the 2010–11 season and scored three goals in four games for the League Two team. He joined Gillingham on a permanent basis in July 2011. Whelpdale was part of the Gillingham side that won the 2012–13 League Two title.

Stevenage 
He rejected a new deal from Gillingham and signed for League Two side Stevenage on 30 June 2014.

AFC Wimbledon 
On 28 June 2016 Whelpdale signed for League One side AFC Wimbledon. He scored his first goal for Wimbledon in a 3–2 EFL Cup loss against Peterborough United on 9 August 2016.

Stevenage 
On 28 July 2017, Whelpdale re-signed for Stevenage. Whelpdale made 27 League Two appearances, starting 19 times, scoring once, before departing the club.

Chelmsford City 
On 10 August 2018, Whelpdale signed for Chelmsford City. On 27 August 2018, Whelpdale scored his first goal for the club in a 5–3 away win against Hemel Hempstead Town. On 30 January 2020, Whelpdale was confirmed as assistant to interim manager Robbie Simpson alongside Michael Spillane following the sacking of Rod Stringer.

Eastbourne Borough 
On 29 July 2020, Whelpdale left Chelmsford to join fellow National League South club Eastbourne Borough.

Career statistics

References

External links

1987 births
Living people
English footballers
Association football midfielders
Maldon & Tiptree F.C. players
Billericay Town F.C. players
Peterborough United F.C. players
Gillingham F.C. players
Stevenage F.C. players
AFC Wimbledon players
Chelmsford City F.C. players
Eastbourne Borough F.C. players
English Football League players
Isthmian League players
Chelmsford City F.C. non-playing staff